Ekaterina Igorevna Poleshchuk (born 24 March 1994) is a Russian freestyle wrestler. She is a bronze medalist at the World Wrestling Championships and the European Wrestling Championships.

Career 

She won one of the bronze medals in the women's 53 kg event at the Golden Grand Prix Ivan Yarygin 2017 and Golden Grand Prix Ivan Yarygin 2018 held in Krasnoyarsk, Russia. She also won one of the bronze medals in this event at the 2017 U23 World Wrestling Championships held in Bydgoszcz, Poland.

In 2019, she won a bronze medal in the women's 50 kg event at the World Wrestling Championships held in Nur-Sultan, Kazakhstan.

In 2020, she won the gold medal in the women's 50 kg event at the Individual Wrestling World Cup held in Belgrade, Serbia. In 2021, she won one of the bronze medals in the 50 kg event at the European Wrestling Championships held in Warsaw, Poland.

Achievements

References

External links 
 

Living people
1994 births
Place of birth missing (living people)
Russian female sport wrestlers
World Wrestling Championships medalists
European Wrestling Championships medalists
People from Gulkevichsky District
Sportspeople from Krasnodar Krai
20th-century Russian women
21st-century Russian women